The  Grand Prix of Baltimore presented by SRT was an open-wheel IndyCar motor race and held as the fourteenth and penultimate round of the 2012 IndyCar Series season. It took place on Sunday, September 2, 2012. The race was contested over 75 laps at the  temporary street circuit at Baltimore, Maryland, United States and was co-located with the Baltimore Sports Car Challenge motor race.

The race was won by American racer Ryan Hunter-Reay racing for Andretti Autosport. Hunter-Reay finished 1.4 seconds ahead of Australian driver Ryan Briscoe driving for Team Penske with Frenchman Simon Pagenaud finishing third for Schmidt Hamilton Motorsports. It was Hunter-Reay's fourth win for the year. With just one race left in the season, Hunter-Reay's victory, coupled with Will Power finishing in sixth position closed the gap between the two championship rivals to just 17 points.

Classification

Race results

Notes
 Points include 1 point for pole position and 2 points for most laps led.

Standings after the race

Drivers' Championship

Manufacturers' Championship

Note: Only the top five positions are included for the driver standings.

References

External links

Baltimore Grand Prix
Baltimore
Grand Prix of Baltimore
Grand Prix of Baltimore
2010s in Baltimore